Češnjice is a small settlement in the hills south of Boštanj in the Municipality of Sevnica in central Slovenia. The area is part of the historical region of Lower Carniola and is now included in the Lower Sava Statistical Region.

References

External links
Češnjice at Geopedia

Populated places in the Municipality of Sevnica